Agia Varvara is a station on Athens Metro Line 3.

Location
The station is located underneath Eleftheriou Venizelou street, near Agia Eleousa square in Agia Varvara.

Station description
The station can be accessed by three ground-level entrances, all of which lead to the concourse level. The concourse level is rectangular, daylight-penetrated, with burgundy walls and white ceiling. The platforms are on a north-south axis and each platform's decoration is divided in three sections. The north and south sides' walls are covered with unpolished granite blocks. In the middle section the platforms are slightly wider, the ceiling is supported by cylindrical pillars and the walls are covered with slightly angled burgundy metal panels. The ceiling is white and the part above the tracks is covered with curved white metal panels.

Exits

Antiquities
Parts of an ancient pipeline were discovered during the station's construction. The reconstructed pipeline is exhibited on the concourse level.

Nearby points of interest
Agia Eleousa church
Agia Varvara town hall
Mitera grove

Station layout

References

Athens Metro stations
Railway stations opened in 2020
2020 establishments in Greece